Frank Stewart (born 1949) is an African-American photographer based in New York.  He is best known for photographing prominent Jazz musicians.

Biography 
Frank Stewart was born in 1949, in Nashville, Tennessee, and was raised in Memphis and Chicago.  At the age of 14, he took his first photograph at the March on Washington for Jobs and Freedom. For most of his career, he has been a documentary photographer. With funding from two National Endowment for the Arts Grants, Stewart traveled the country photographing African American communities. In 1977, he was included as part of the first team of journalists allowed into Communist Cuba. Stewart worked closely with artist Romare Bearden, photographing him at home and at his studio, from 1975 until the artist's death in 1988. Stewart was invited by the Olympic Committee to be the official staff photographer for the 1984 Summer Olympics in Los Angeles. As part of Kamoinge, an African-American photography collective based in New York, he traveled to New Orleans' ninth ward to photo-document the devastation wrought by Hurrican Katrina in 2005. He was an adjunct professor of photography at the State University of New York (SUNY) at Purchase, and served as a consultant for the National Urban League.

Frank Stewart is best known for his jazz photographs. He got his start working on the road, touring clubs with jazz pianist and composer Ahmad Jamal in the mid-1970s. For almost 50 years, he has photographed some of the most notable jazz musicians including, Miles Davis, Dizzy Gillespie, Max Roach, Sonny Rollins, Dexter Gordon, Lionel Hampton, Roy Hargrove, Marcus Roberts, and Wynton Marsalis. Currently, Frank Stewart is senior staff photographer for Jazz at the Lincoln Center.

Education 
Stewart attended School of the Art Institute of Chicago, and received a BFA in Photography from Cooper Union in New York in 1975.

Exhibitions 
Frank Stewart's photographs have been featured in thirty solo shows and dozens of group exhibitions.

Selected solo exhibitions
 2019 Time Capsule: Photographs by Frank Stewart, Gallery Neptune & Brown
 2017 Their Own Harlems, The Studio Museum in Harlem
 2016 Circa 1970, The Studio Museum in Harlem
 2011 Traveling Full Circle: Frank Stewart's Visual Music, Jazz at LIncoln Center, New York
 2009 The Contemporary Frank Stewart, Essie Green Galleries, New York
 2005 Frank Stewart: Romare Bearden/The Last Years, High Museum, Atlanta,GA
 2004 Frank Stewart, Jazz at Lincoln Center, Time Warner Building, NY, NY
 1997 Frank Stewart: Riffs, Rectangles, and Responses: 25 Years of Photography, Leica Gallery, New York City

Selected group exhibitions
 2010 Panopticon Gallery of Photography, Boston, MA
 2009 Galerie Intemporel, Paris, France
 2009 Sound: Print: Record, University Museums, Newark, Delaware
 2006 Engulfed by Katrina, Photography Before & After the Storm, Nathan Cummings Foundation & NYU Tisch School of the Arts, NY
 2005 Delta to Delta, Museum of Art and Origins, Harlem, New York
 2005 Carnival, Cummings Foundation, New York
 2004 Romare Bearden, Schomburg Center, New York
 2003 Saturday Night Sunday Morning, Leica Gallery, New York City
 2000 Harlem: A Group Exhibition, Leica Gallery, New York City UFA Gallery Presents Jazz Plus, Kamoinge Workshop, New York City
 1999 Black New York Photographers of the 20th Century, Selections from the Schomburg Center Collections, New York City

Collections 
Frank Stewart's photographs are in the permanent collections of several major metropolitan museums, including the Smithsonian National Museum of African American History and Culture, the Museum of Modern Art (MoMA), and the High Museum.

Honors and rewards 

 National Endowment for the Arts Fellowship (twice)
NIFFA Fellowship in 2002
New York Creative Artist Public Service Award
Jazz Journalists of America’s Lona Foote-Bob Parent Award for Career Excellence

Publications 

 Romare Bearden: Photographs by Frank Stewart (Pomegranate Communications Inc., 2004)
The Sweet Breath of Life'''', poems by Ntozake Shange, photographs edited by Frank Stewart, photographs by Kamoinge (Simon & Schuster, 2004.)
Smokestack Lightning: Adventures in the Heart of Barbecue Country, written by Lolis Eric Elie with photographs by Frank Stewart (Farrar, Straus & Giroux, 1996)
Sweet Swing Blues on the Road, written by Wynton Marsalis with photographs by Frank Stewart (W.W. Norton & Company, 1994).

References

External links 
Official site
Interview with frank Stewart

1949 births
Living people
African-American photographers
20th-century American photographers
21st-century American photographers
20th-century African-American artists
21st-century African-American artists